Ineta Mackeviča (born 11 July 1992 in Liepaja) is a Latvian professional squash player. As of February 2018, she was ranked number 84 in the world.

References

1992 births
Living people
Female squash players
Latvian sportswomen
Latvian squash players
Sportspeople from Liepāja